Lucie Charvátová (born 1 February 1993) is a Czech biathlete. She was born in Hradec Králové. She has competed in the Biathlon World Cup, and represented the Czech Republic at the Biathlon World Championships 2016.

Biathlon results
All results are sourced from the International Biathlon Union.

Olympic Games
0 medals

World Championships
1 medal (1 bronze)

*During Olympic seasons competitions are only held for those events not included in the Olympic program.
**The single mixed relay was added as an event in 2019.

References

External links

1993 births
Living people
Czech female biathletes
Sportspeople from Hradec Králové
Biathlon World Championships medalists
Biathletes at the 2022 Winter Olympics
Olympic biathletes of the Czech Republic